Michael Najeeb Zadick (born July 12, 1978) is an American freestyle wrestler. He participated in Men's freestyle 60 kg at the 2008 Summer Olympics. He lost in the 1/8 finals to Vasyl Fedoryshyn

International wrestling career 
Mike Zadick won a silver medal at 2006 FILA Wrestling World Championships in Guangzhou, China, defeating two-time Olympic champion Mavlet Batirov in the semi-final. He is a two-time champion at 60 kg at the Dave Schultz Memorial International Championship (2006 and 2010). In 2007, Zadick failed to place at the 2007 FILA Wrestling World Championships in Baku, Azerbaijan. He was the silver medalist at the 2007 Pan American Games in Rio de Janeiro, Brazil.

As a youth wrestler, Zadick had national success competing in USA Wrestling age-group events in both freestyle and Greco-Roman styles. He placed fourth in the 1994 Cadet World Championships in Greco-Roman, and was the 1996 Junior Nationals champion in both freestyle and Greco-Roman. In 1997, he was Junior Nationals runner-up in freestyle and Junior Nationals champion in Greco-Roman. He was named Outstanding Wrestler in Freestyle at the 1996 Junior Nationals.

College wrestling career 
Zadick was a three-time all-American wrestler (2000–02) at the University of Iowa, winning the 149-pound Big Ten Conference title in 2002. He finished seventh in the 2000 and 2002 NCAA Tournaments, and third in the 2001 NCAA Tournament.

He earned a bachelor's degree from Iowa in 2002 in Health, Leisure, and Sport Studies.

High school wrestling career 
Zadick wrestled at Great Falls High School. He is one of only 17 wrestlers in Montana to win four state championships, which he accomplished in four different weight classes: 103 pounds (1994), 119 pounds (1995), 125 pounds (1996) and 135 pounds (1997). Three of his state championships (1995–97) capped undefeated seasons.

Zadick holds Montana state high school wrestling records for most career wins (154) and consecutive wins (122). He is third on the state record list for most falls (101). He was named an ASICS Tiger High School First-Team All-American in 1997.

Coaching career 
Zadick was an assistant Coach at Iowa State University for two years after spending 4 years (2012-2016) as an assistant coach at Virginia Tech. He previously spent 10 years on the staff at the University of Iowa head coach Tom Brands. He served for two years as the interim assistant coach (2010-2012), four years as the team's volunteer assistant coach (2004–06, 2009-2010), and previously served as the Hawkeyes' strength training coach for three seasons (2006–08). During his tenure, Iowa has won two NCAA national championships (2008–09), and two Big Ten Conference team titles (2008–09). The Hawkeyes have crowned three NCAA champions, four Big Ten champions, 24 all-Americans and 28 academic all-Big Ten honorees.

Personal information 
Mike and his older brother, Bill Zadick, are part of the University of Iowa's tradition of brothers competing for the Hawkeyes. Bill was the 2006 World Champion at 145.5 pounds (66 kg) and a two-time all-American for the Hawkeyes, winning a Big Ten and NCAA title at 142 pounds in 1996. Bill also served as Iowa's volunteer assistant coach for the 2003 and 2004 seasons.

External links
 Wrestler bio on beijing2008.com
 Mike Zadick wins silver
 USA Wrestling national team member biography
 University of Iowa athlete/coach biography

Living people
1978 births
Olympic wrestlers of the United States
Wrestlers at the 2007 Pan American Games
Wrestlers at the 2008 Summer Olympics
Sportspeople from Great Falls, Montana
American male sport wrestlers
Pan American Games medalists in wrestling
Pan American Games silver medalists for the United States
World Wrestling Championships medalists
Medalists at the 2007 Pan American Games